Luke Vogels (born 7 June 1983) is a former Australian rules footballer in the Australian Football League.

Vogels played for the Geelong Falcons in the TAC Cup junior competition, but was overlooked in the AFL Draft. In 2004 he played as a member of the Terang Mortlake Football Club winning the Maskel Medal and also the Premiership that same year.

He was elevated from the Sydney Swans rookie list in 2005 and made his debut in Round 7 later that year against Essendon. He was delisted by Sydney at the end of the 2007 season.

References

External links

1983 births
Living people
Australian rules footballers from Victoria (Australia)
Sydney Swans players
Geelong Falcons players